Citripestis is a genus of snout moths. It was described by Ragonot in 1893, and is known from Java, Indonesia and Perak.

Species
 Citripestis eutraphera (Meyrick, 1933)
 Citripestis sagittiferella (Moore, 1891)

References

Phycitinae
Pyralidae genera